Zingzingbar is a Border Roads Organization road-building camp and tea house way-station situated  from Darcha on the Manali to Leh road in the Lahaul and Spiti district of Himachal Pradesh. The location has temporary shelters and dhabas that can be used by trekkers and tourists for accommodation.

The north portal of this tunnel is expected to be at Keylong Sarai. The tunnel will reduce the transit time on the avalanche and landslide prone route by up to 2 hrs.

References

Cities and towns in Lahaul and Spiti district